Forsteropsalis photophaga, also known as the glow-worm hunter, is a species of long-legged harvestman in the family Neopilionidae. This species is endemic to New Zealand, found in North Island caves in the vicinity of Waitomo. The name "photophaga" comes from their habit of feeding on the luminescent larvae, pupae, and adults of the New Zealand glow-worm Arachnocampa luminosa.

Taxonomy 
Both Aola Richards and Meyer-Rochow and Liddle had previously recorded a species of harvestman in caves at Waitomo feeding on glow-worms which they identified as Megalopsalis tumida (now considered a synonym of Forsteropsalis fabulosa). Further examination of specimens from the cave revealed this harvestman was in fact two new species of Forsteropsalis. These were named and described in 2014 by Chris Taylor and Anna Probert as Forsteropsalis bona and F. photophaga. 

Forsteropsalis photophaga was so named for its habit of feeding on the luminescent glow-worm: its name is from the Greek phos (light) and phagein (to eat). The holotype specimen, collected in Gardners Gut Cave System, Waitomo, in 1977, is deposited in the collections of Te Papa; six paratypes were collected from other cave systems in the vicinity of Waitomo and Te Kuiti between 1958 and 2013.

Description 

At the time of description, all known specimens of F. photophaga were male. The species is brown in colour, with pale yellow longitudinal stripes. Body length without legs is 3.5–6.1 mm and the legs themselves are around 25 mm long. 

Harvestmen in the genus Forsteropsalis are highly sexually dimorphic, with males and females differing in morphology: males have enlarged chelicerae used to fight other males in competition, with a pinching claw used to grab and pin down the opponent. F. photophaga males have long orange-brown chelicerae: segment I is 3.4–6.5 mm long, and segment II 4.9–9.1 mm. A distinguishing feature of this species is rows of large denticles on the second segment of these chelicerae, not seen in any other New Zealand Neopilionidae.

Diet and predators 

The New Zealand glow-worm (Arachnocampa luminosa) is a species of midge, whose larvae luminesce to lure flying insects into sticky silken threads. Glow-worms are notably abundant in Waitomo cave systems, and the Glowworm Caves are an international tourist attraction. Harvestmen species like F. photophaga and F. bona have been observed extracting glow-worm larvae from their silken nests on the cave roof, without being entangled in sticky threads. Both males and females of F. photophaga have plumose setae on their pedipalps, the adhesive properties of which may help capture glow-worm larvae, pupae, and adults.

New Zealand harvestmen are eaten by various vertebrate species, including introduced mammals (possums, hedgehogs, rats, stoats), bats, birds, frogs, tuatara, and fish (kōaro). Invertebrate predators such as spiders also prey upon harvestmen and cannibalism occurs within the Neopilionidae. Like other Eupnoi harvestmen, Forsteropsalis photophaga can autotomise legs to escape potential predators, breaking the leg off at a pre-determined breakage plane between the trochanter and femur.  New Zealand Neopilionidae will also often employ thanatosis, or playing dead, when disturbed. Parasitic mites are frequently found attached to New Zealand harvestmen, including at least one undescribed species of Microtrombidiidae found on F. photophaga.

References

External links 

 Forsteropsalis photophaga discussed in RNZ Critter of the Week, 16 December 2022

Arachnids of New Zealand
Harvestmen
Endemic fauna of New Zealand
Endemic arthropods of New Zealand
Animals described in 2014